Jonathan Condo (born August 26, 1981) is a former American football long snapper in the National Football League (NFL) for the Oakland Raiders, Atlanta Falcons and San Francisco 49ers. He was signed by the Dallas Cowboys as an undrafted free agent in 2005. He played college football at the University of Maryland.

Early years
Condo attended Philipsburg-Osceola Area High School. As a junior, he rushed for 1,008 yards and nine touchdowns, averaged 17 tackles per
game and received All-conference honors as a running back, linebacker and punter.

As a senior, he rushed for nearly 1,000 yards, had more than 100 tackles, 13 sacks and 3 interceptions. He set school career records for rushing yards (2,700) and tackles (374). He received first-team All-state honors at linebacker and All-Big 8 Conference honors at running back, linebacker and punter. He participated in the Big 33 Football Classic.

He was an All-State selection in baseball, as a catcher on the P-O baseball squad. As a senior, he won the PIAA Wrestling AAA classification 275 lb weight limit championship, while finishing the year with only one blemish on his record.

College career
Condo attended the University of Maryland, where he played for the Maryland Terrapins football team. He became the team's long snapper as a sophomore and also served as a backup defensive end.

He was the starter at long snapper for 38 straight games. As a senior, he appeared in all 13 games and received the team award for "Top Special Teams Performer", becoming the first pure long snapper to earn the honor in school history.

Professional career

Dallas Cowboys
Condo was signed as an undrafted free agent by the Dallas Cowboys after 2005 NFL Draft on April 29. He made the team as the long snapper over Jeff Robinson. Although he played in the first three games of the season, his struggles forced the team to waive him on September 28. He was replaced with L. P. Ladouceur.

New England Patriots
On January 17, 2006, he was signed to a futures contract by the New England Patriots. He was released on August 21.

Oakland Raiders

On November 29, 2006, he was signed by the Oakland Raiders to their practice squad and would become the team's long snapper the next year.

Condo was an exclusive rights free agent in 2008, but the Raiders re-signed him. On October 19, in a game against the New York Jets, the Raiders were forced to punt on a 3 and out. Condo directly snapped the ball to outside linebacker Jon Alston, who ran it for 22 yards on a fake punt play. He was added to the Pro Bowl for 2010 after kicker Sebastian Janikowski made 33 field goals and punter Shane Lechler posted a 47.0 average.

On July 27, 2011, the Oakland Raiders re-signed Condo to a three-year deal.  He was again selected to play in the 2012 Pro Bowl.  He joined teammates punter Shane Lechler, kicker Sebastian Janikowski, and defensive lineman Richard Seymour.

On September 10, 2012, Condo left a game against the San Diego Chargers with a concussion. In his absence, the backup long snapper, Travis Goethel, botched two snaps and had another punt blocked. The Raiders went on to lose the game 22–14, and much of the blame was put on the special teams' miscues.

On August 4, 2013, Condo signed a three-year contract extension with the Oakland Raiders. On December 16, 2015, he was placed on the injured reserve list with a shoulder injury and was replaced with Thomas Gafford.

On March 20, 2017, he was re-signed by the Raiders. On March 14, 2018, Condo was not re-signed by the Raiders, and became a free agent.

Atlanta Falcons
On December 4, 2018, Condo was signed by the Atlanta Falcons to replace and injured Josh Harris. He appeared in the final four games and wasn't re-signed at the end of the season.

San Francisco 49ers
On September 17, 2019, Condo was signed by the San Francisco 49ers to replace a struggling Colin Holba. He announced his retirement on September 23, after one game played with the team, and was placed on the reserve/retired list. He was replaced with Garrison Sanborn.

References

External links

Maryland Terrapins bio

1981 births
Living people
People from Philipsburg, Centre County, Pennsylvania
Players of American football from Pennsylvania
American Conference Pro Bowl players
American football long snappers
Dallas Cowboys players
Maryland Terrapins football players
New England Patriots players
Oakland Raiders players
Atlanta Falcons players
San Francisco 49ers players
Ed Block Courage Award recipients